Ulrich Jacques Potgieter (born 24 April 1986 in Port Elizabeth, South Africa) is a South African rugby union player who last played for Munakata Sanix Blues in the Japanese Top League.

Career

Youth / Sharks / Eastern Province Kings

Blue Bulls / Bulls

In August 2011, the  announced that they had signed Potgieter for the 2012 season on a two-year contract. An early release of his contract was secured and he joined the Bulls on 1 September.

Fukuoka Sanix Blues / Waratahs

In May 2013, it was revealed that he would leave the Bulls at the end of the 2013 Super Rugby season.

Sharks

However, he did not make a single appearance for the side.

Return to the Bulls

An injury ruled Potgieter out for the start of the 2016 season and in May, the  announced that he would return to Pretoria on a two-year deal with immediate effect.

South Africa

He became a Springbok on 23 June 2012 against  during a test played at Nelson Mandela Bay Stadium.

References

External links
 Jacques Potgieter's profile on itsrugby.co.uk

1986 births
South African rugby union players
South African people of Dutch descent
South Africa international rugby union players
Bulls (rugby union) players
Blue Bulls players
Rugby union flankers
Eastern Province Elephants players
Sharks (Currie Cup) players
New South Wales Waratahs players
Afrikaner people
Rugby union players from Port Elizabeth
Living people
Expatriate rugby union players in Japan
Expatriate rugby union players in Australia
Munakata Sanix Blues players
South African expatriate sportspeople in Japan
South African expatriate sportspeople in Australia
South African expatriate rugby union players
RC Toulonnais players
Free State Cheetahs players
Tel Aviv Heat players
South African expatriate sportspeople in Israel
Expatriate rugby union players in Israel